is a railway station in Hatsukaichi, Hiroshima Prefecture, Japan, operated by West Japan Railway Company (JR West).

Lines
Maezora Station is served by the Sanyō Main Line.

History 
Maezora station opened on 11 March 2000.

See also

 List of railway stations in Japan

References

External links

  

Railway stations in Hiroshima Prefecture
Sanyō Main Line
Railway stations in Japan opened in 2000